This article is a list of notable individuals who were born in and/or have lived in Arvada, Colorado.

Arts and entertainment

Art
 Bruce Blackburn (1938–2021), American graphic designer of the United States Bicentennial logo.

Fashion
 Taylor Marie Hill (born 1996), model

Film, television, and theatre
 Barry Kooser (born 1968), animator
 Nick Stabile (born 1971), actor
 Matt Weatherford (born 1967), film critic

Literature
 Clive Cussler (1931–2020 ), novelist, explorer
 Kristen Iversen, non-fiction writer

Music
 Chris Daring, fiddler
 Brian Ibbott (born 1969), music podcaster, producer
 Joe King (born 1980), guitarist, songwriter
 Isaac Slade (born 1981), pianist, singer-songwriter

Photography
 Lowell Georgia (1933–2021), National Geographic photographer.

Politics

National
 Bob Beauprez (born 1948), U.S. Representative.
 Karl Rove (born 1950), Republican political consultant, Senior Advisor to the President of the United States, and Deputy Chief of Staff.

State
 Sara Gagliardi (born 1958), Colorado state legislator
 Evie Hudak (born 1951), Colorado state legislator
 Brianna Titone (born 1978), Colorado state legislator
 John Charles Vivian (1889–1964), 30th Governor of Colorado
 Laura J. Woods (born 1961), Colorado state legislator
 Rachel Zenzinger, Colorado state legislator

Local
 Joanne Conte (1933–2013), Arvada city councilwoman, transgender activist

Religion
 James D. Conley (born 1955), Roman Catholic bishop
 Bob Enyart (born 1959), fundamentalist Christian pastor, radio host

Sports

American football
 Greg Brown (born 1957), coach
 Patrick Cain (1962–2016), center, guard
 Mark Cooney (1951–2011), linebacker
 Joe DeCamillis (born 1965), coach
 Joel Klatt (born 1982), quarterback, sportscaster
 Brian Lee (born 1975), defensive back
 Kevin McDougal (born 1977), running back
 Cliff Olander (born 1955), quarterback
 Brad Pyatt (born 1980), wide receiver

Baseball
 Tagg Bozied (born 1979), 1st baseman
 Roy Halladay (1977–2017), pitcher

Bodybuilding
 Phil Heath (born 1979), bodybuilder, 13th Mr. Olympia
 Alina Popa (born 1978), IFBB professional bodybuilder

Martial arts
 Justin Gaethje (born 1987), mixed martial arts fighter
 Neil Magny (born 1987), mixed martial arts fighter
 Matt Wiman (born 1983), mixed martial arts fighter

Other
 Rick Carelli (born 1955), race car driver
 Nick Fazekas (born 1985), basketball center, power forward
 Casey Malone (born 1977), U.S. Olympic discus thrower
 Erika Sutton (born 1987), soccer defender
 Babe Didrikson Zaharias (1911–1956), U.S. Olympic track and field athlete, golfer

References

Arvada, Colorado
Arvada
Arvada, Colorado